King George V Sixth Form College  (KGV) is a sixth form college in Southport, Merseyside, England. It provides A-level and BTEC education, and between 2009 and 2012 offered the International Baccalaureate Diploma. It was previously a grammar school for boys. The college has the distinction of being placed consistently in the top 10 sixth form and further education colleges in the country for A-level results, and has won a number of Good Schools Guide awards.

History
The college opened in September 1920 as Southport Municipal Secondary School for Boys. New buildings were constructed at the current site on Scarisbrick New Road in 1926, in preparation for a reopening by the Earl of Derby on 16 October of that year, when the institution was rechristened King George V Grammar School. In September 1979 the college assumed its current name; in 1982 its school section ceased to exist.

In October 2014, Ofsted placed KGV — previously a grade 1 'outstanding' college — in the 'inadequate' or grade 4 boundary for education providers. The report cited a lack of effective leadership and severe staff cuts as reasons for its poor findings. In June of the following year, Ofsted upgraded the college's 'inadequate' grade after a second report announced significant improvement. Since 2014 several of the site's buildings have been refurbished, including the sports hall and the humanities building. During this renovation the two-room Classics building, then the longest-standing building on the campus, was demolished.

Academic structure

The college no longer uses the house system established when it also served as a secondary school. It previously opted for five subject specific faculties, namely:

 AE - Arts and English Subjects.
 BI - Business and Information Subjects.
 HL - Humanities and Languages Subjects.
 MS - Maths and Science Subjects.
 SO - Social Science Subjects, including sociology, psychology and the PASE scheme.

Students' union
The college hosts an independent students' union which is a member of the National Union of Students. The student union is run by the Student Council, which meets at least once a month. Student Council members are typically second-year students elected by members of their tutor groups. The council's two co-chairpersons are elected in a college-wide student election, and are members of KGV's governing body as required by the Education Act 1994.

Notable alumni

King George V College
 Sarah Barrand, actress.
 Sophie Howard, glamour model.
 Joanne Nicholas, Badminton player.
 Stacey Roca, actress.

King George V Grammar School
 Marc Almond of Soft Cell.
 John Culshaw OBE, classical record producer and Head of Music Programmes at the BBC from 1967–75.
 Arthur Davidson, Member of Parliament for Accrington from 1966–83.
 Air Vice-Marshal Peter Dodworth CB OBE, Station Commander of RAF Wittering from 1983-85.
 Michael English, Member of Parliament for Nottingham West from 1964–83.
 Ronnie Fearn, Baron Fearn, Member of Parliament for Southport from 1987–92 and 1997-2001.
 Frank Hampson, artist and creator of Dan Dare.
 Michael Weston King, singer.
 David Lonsdale, actor.
 Michael Meadowcroft, Member of Parliament for Leeds West from 1983-87.
 John Pickard FRCS FMedSci, professor emeritus of neurosurgery at the University of Cambridge.

References

External links

 King George V College
 The Old Georgians' Association
 EduBase

Education in the Metropolitan Borough of Sefton
Learning and Skills Beacons
Educational institutions established in 1926
Sixth form colleges in Merseyside
1926 establishments in England